The golden calf is an idol in the Bible and the Qur'an.

Golden calf may also refer to:

Books
 The Little Golden Calf, a 1931 Soviet novel by writers Ilf and Petrov

Film and television
 Golden Calf (award), a Dutch film award
 The Golden Calf (1925 film), a 1925 German film
 The Golden Calf (1930 film), a 1930 American pre-Code comedy film
 The Golden Calf (1968 film), a 1968 black and white Soviet film based on the novel
 Mooby the Golden Calf, a fictional character in director Kevin Smith's film settings

Other
 "The Golden Calf", a song on the Prefab Sprout album From Langley Park to Memphis
 A sculpture by British artist Damien Hirst
 Le veau d'or est toujours debout (The Golden Calf is still standing), an aria in Charles Gounod's opera Faust
Le Veau d'Or restaurant